James Beech (1871; date of death unknown) was an English footballer who played as a centre-half for Burslem Port Vale between 1894 and 1902, making 151 appearances in the Football League.

Career
Beech played for Smallthorne St. Saviour and Smallthorne Albion, before joining Burslem Port Vale in May 1894. He made 14 Second Division appearances in the 1894–95 season, but featured just twice in the 1895–96 campaign. The club then spent two seasons in the Midland League, and Beech was part of the side that won the Staffordshire Senior Cup in 1898. Vale were then re-elected into the Football League, and Beech played 31 league games in the 1898–99 season, and scored goals at the Athletic Ground in wins over Burton Swifts, Blackpool, and Lincoln City. He played 31 league matches in the 1899–1900 and 1900–01 campaigns, and claimed goals against Burton Swifts, Birmingham City, and Glossop. However, in November 1901 he became seriously ill and retired from football at the end of the 1901–02 season. His benefit match was held against rivals Stoke on 15 April 1901; Vale won the game 2–1.

Career statistics
Source:

Honours
Burslem Port Vale
Staffordshire Senior Cup: 1898

References

1871 births
Year of death missing
Footballers from Stoke-on-Trent
English footballers
Association football defenders
Port Vale F.C. players
English Football League players
Midland Football League players